Palmetto Point is a town on the island of Saint Kitts in Saint Kitts and Nevis. 

It is the capital of Trinity Palmetto Point Parish.

Populated places in Saint Kitts and Nevis
Trinity Palmetto Point Parish